Miltochrista phaeoxanthia is a moth of the family Erebidae. It was described by George Hampson in 1900. It is found in Assam, India.

References

 

phaeoxanthia
Moths described in 1900
Moths of Asia